DiGennaro Communications, also known as DGC, is an independent B2B and B2C public relations and communications company based in New York City. The company has been on Inc. Magazine’s Inc. 5000 list of America’s fastest growing companies since 2011.

History
DiGennaro Communications was founded in 2006 by its chief executive officer, Samantha DiGennaro, who previously ran the corporate communications team at J. Walter Thompson. In January 2012, DiGennaro Communications partnered with Eulogy, a London-based public relations firm, to broaden its global business.

In 2013, the company reported an annual revenue of $5 million. Also in 2013, DiGenarro Communications formed a strategic partnership with Sydney-based Access PR.

DiGennaro Communications works with clients including Facebook, Ringling Bros. and Barnum & Bailey Circus, McDonald’s, Ogilvy & Mather, Live Nation Entertainment, and BMW to get their stories covered in outlets such as The New York Times and place their executives on the global speaker circuit.

References

Public relations companies of the United States